David Charles Rhodes (20 May 1948 – 15 February 2013) was an Australian rules footballer who played with Fitzroy in the Victorian Football League (VFL).

Rhodes, a blonde headed winger, spent six seasons with Fitzroy before transferring to Western Australia, to play for Subiaco. He was good enough to represent Victoria at the 1972 Perth Carnival.

References

Holmesby, Russell and Main, Jim (2007). The Encyclopedia of AFL Footballers. 7th ed. Melbourne: Bas Publishing.

External links

1948 births
2013 deaths
Australian rules footballers from Victoria (Australia)
Fitzroy Football Club players
Cobden Football Club players
Subiaco Football Club players